"Inside the Ivory Tower" is a ranking of the world's best university programs in international relations. The ranking is published by the Foreign Policy magazine in collaboration with the Teaching, Research, and International Policy (TRIP) Project at the College of William & Mary. The survey is based on input from "all international relations scholars employed at a college or university who have an affiliation with a political science department or school of public policy and who teach or conduct research on issues that cross international borders."

The first TRIP Faculty Survey was conducted in 2004. One of the questions asked respondents to rank International Relations graduate schools in the U.S. The survey has since expanded to include undergraduate programs. The survey began including universities outside of the U.S. in 2009. The survey was last conducted in 2018, and asks the respondents to rank the top five international relations programs by degree level. The rankings are determined by the percentage of respondents who list a particular school.

2018 rankings

2014 rankings

2012 rankings

2009 rankings
Methodology note for 2009 rankings: Undergraduate programs were ranked by individual country in this particular survey.  For full undergraduate listings, see the original survey.

2007 rankings
Methodology note for 2007 rankings: Only schools based in the United States were ranked in this particular survey.

2005 rankings
Methodology note for 2005 rankings: Only the graduate programs of schools based in the United States were ranked in this particular survey.

References

External links
 Foreign Policy's 2018 Ivory Tower Rankings
 Foreign Policy's 2012 Ivory Tower homepage and link to rankings
 2009 Rankings
 2007 Ivory Tower Rankings
 2005 Ivory Tower Rankings
 TRIP Faculty Survey

University and college rankings